The state of Louisiana has 21 state parks, which are governed by the Office of Lieutenant Governor, a division of the Louisiana Department of Culture, Recreation and Tourism. Louisiana's state park system began in 1934 when the state passed legislation that created the State Parks Commission of Louisiana. In 1952, legislation broadened the role of the commission to include the development of outdoor recreation programs and resources.  The commission was renamed to the Louisiana State Parks and Recreation Commission. In 1977, the Office of State Parks was created in the Department of Culture, Recreation, and Tourism.

After the State Parks Commission of Louisiana was formed in 1934, 7 sites were acquired for use as state parks.  During World War II, the rate of new park acquisition declined with the addition of only one new site, Sam Houston Jones State Park in 1944.  In 1966, the National Park Service reviewed Louisiana's state parks system and made many recommendations, which led to specific guidelines and requirements for state parks.  Over time, many state parks that did not meet these guidelines were either reclassified as state historic sites or were turned over to local or state agencies.  Some of these parks include , Saline Bayou, and Black Lake.  During the 1970s, government management of the state parks was restructured.  The Office of State Parks was created, and 2 new parks were acquired.  From 1995 to 2009, $80 million were invested in creating new facilities, or updating existing facilities.

Louisiana state parks are selected on the criteria that they must be natural areas of unique or exceptional scenic value. Many of the state parks also have historic or scientific importance. For example, Chemin-A-Haut State Park served as a route used by Native Americans during seasonal migrations. Louisiana state parks have many accommodations, including overnight cabins, boating rentals, guided daily tours, and fishing piers. In 2002, Louisiana state parks had more than 2 million visitors.

Current parks

Other names of current parks
The following are significantly different former or alternate names for current Louisiana state parks.

Former state parks
The following are parks that were officially recognized as a state park after the 1966 National Park Service review, but were later removed.

See also

List of Louisiana state historic sites
Louisiana State Arboretum
List of U.S. national parks

References

External links

 Louisiana State Parks

 
Louisiana state parks
State parks